The Louisville Cardinals football statistical leaders are individual statistical leaders of the Louisville Cardinals football program in various categories, including passing, rushing, receiving, total offense, defensive stats, and kicking. Within those areas, the lists identify single-game, single-season, and career leaders. The Cardinals represent the University of Louisville in the NCAA Division I Atlantic Coast Conference.

Louisville began competing in intercollegiate football in 1912. However, these lists are dominated by more recent players for several reasons:
 Since the 1940s, seasons have increased from 10 games to 11 and then 12 games in length.
 The NCAA didn't allow freshmen to play varsity football until 1972 (with the exception of the World War II years), allowing players to have four-year careers.
 Bowl games only began counting toward single-season and career statistics in 2002. The Cardinals have played in 14 bowl games since then, with a 15th assured in 2021, giving many recent players an extra game to accumulate statistics.
 Due to COVID-19, the NCAA ruled that the 2020 season would not count against any player's athletic eligibility, giving everyone who played in that season the opportunity for five years of eligibility instead of the standard four.

These lists are updated through the end of the 2021 regular season.

Passing

Passing yards

Passing touchdowns

Rushing

Rushing yards

Rushing touchdowns

Receiving

Receptions

Receiving yards

Receiving touchdowns

Total offense
Total offense is the sum of passing and rushing statistics. It does not include receiving or returns.

Total offense yards

Touchdowns responsible for
"Touchdowns responsible for" is the official NCAA term for combined passing and rushing touchdowns. Louisville's football guide uses this specific term.

Defense

Interceptions

Tackles

Sacks

Kicking

Field goals made

Field goal percentage
While past Louisville media guides have included this statistic, the 2021 edition does not include any listings over any time frame.

References

Louisville

Louisville, Kentucky-related lists